The giant golden mole (Chrysospalax trevelyani) is a small mammal found in Africa. At  in length, it is the largest of the golden mole species. The mole has dark, glossy brown fur; the name golden comes from the Greek word for green-gold, the family Chrysochloridae name.

Characteristics 
The giant golden mole has a subterranean lifestyle. It has large claws, powerful forelimbs, no external tail or ears, wedge-shaped head, leather pad, and skin covering the eyes. It is approximately 208-235 millimetres in length and 410-500 grams in weight. With dark and brown skin on the upper parts and faded on the underparts, the hair is longer and coarser than any other species of golden mole: thick, with dense, woolly underfur.

Biology 
The largest, rarest, and most endangered of all 17 species of golden moles, the giant golden mole spends most of its time underground and is blind and deaf. It is nocturnal, hunting mostly at night, but also in some cool and cloudy daytime conditions. It is solitary; it does not form groups, despite some social behavior such as hibernating in others' burrows among the roots of trees in winter, only moving slightly to keep its body temperature in range and twitching to maintain body temperature while sleeping. Female Giant Golden moles give birth to one or two offspring at a time while it has stocks of food supply.

Diet 
The giant golden mole digs semi-permanent tunnels for hunting food and may feed on the surface hiding in the leaf litter. It eats mainly millipedes and giant earthworms, but also crickets, cockroaches, grasshoppers, worms, and snails.

Habitat 
The giant golden mole is a subterranean small mammal, living in chambers and passages underneath a very specific habitat, forests with soft soil, deep leaf litter layers, and well-developed undergrowth. The giant golden mole is endemic to South Africa, mostly in a restricted area in the Eastern Cape.

Population

Status 
The giant golden mole was classified as Endangered (EN) in 2010 on IUCN Red List of Threatened Species. The population is decreasing due to habitat loss resulting mainly from human activities affecting its habitat such as firewood collection, bark stripping, cutting for construction, overgrazing of livestock, and clearance of forest. Moreover, the giant golden mole is preyed on by domestic dogs in that area.

Conservation 
The giant golden mole currently receives little protection, and is not a main conservation target. Research is needed to protect this species and to assess the status and viability of the remaining populations.

See also
 Mole
 Golden mole
 IUCN Red List

References 

Endemic fauna of South Africa
Afrosoricida
Mammals of South Africa
Mammals described in 1875
Taxa named by Albert Günther